Grand Ayatollah Sayyid Muhammad Muhammad-Sadiq al-Sadr (23 March 1943 – 19 February 1999) was a prominent Iraqi Shia marja'. He called for government reform and the release of detained Shia leaders. The growth of his popularity, often referred to as the followers of the Vocal Hawza, also put him in competition with other Shi'a leaders, including Mohammed Baqir al-Hakim who was exiled in Iran.

Biography 

al-Sadr was born to Muhammad Sadiq al-Sadr (1906–1986), the grandson of Ismail al-Sadr, the patriarch of the Lebanese al-Sadr family and a first cousin of Muhammad Baqir al-Sadr and Amina al-Sadr.

Following the Gulf War, Shi'ites in Southern Iraq went into open rebellion. A number of provinces overthrew the Baathist entities and rebelled against Saddam Hussein and the Baath Party. The leadership of the Shi'ite rebellion as well as the Shi'ite doctrine in Iraq was split between Ayatollah Ali Al-Sistani and Ayatollah Muhammad Sadiq Al-Sadr. Al-Sadr, based in Baghdad, appealed to the younger, more radical Shi'ites from the more impoverished areas of Southern Iraq. The Shi'ites travelled to Baghdad from these poor areas to join Al-Sadr and his Shi'ite leadership. The area which Al-Sadr preached in and these poor Shi'ites occupied became known as "Revolution Township". In this ghetto, Sadr established a secret network of devoted followers and he became an increasingly prominent figure in the Iraqi political scene. 

As a result of the disenfranchisement and repression of the Shi'ites in Iraq and the loyalty of the local populations, Saddam Hussein and his Baathist government could not control the Revolution Township on a neighbourhood level. Their lack of control limited their ability to affect al-Sadr's power base and the devotion of his followers. Revolution Township was renamed Sadr City.  

As his power grew, al-Sadr became more and more involved in politics following the Gulf War, and throughout the 1990s, he openly defied Saddam. He organized the poor Shi'ites of Sadr City, yet another nickname for the impoverished Shi'ite ghetto in Baghdad, against Saddam and the Baath Party. Sadr gained the support of the Shi'ites by reaching out to tribal villages and offering services to them that they would otherwise not have been afforded by Hussein's regime. Saddam began to crack down on the Shi'ite leaders in the late 1990s in an attempt to regain control of Iraq. 

Sometime before his death, al-Sadr was informed of Saddam's limited patience with him. In defiance, al-Sadr wore his death shroud to his final Friday sermon to show that the Shi'ites would not be intimidated by Saddam's oppression and that Sadr would preach the truth even if it meant his own death. He was later killed leaving the mosque in the Iraqi city of Najaf along with two of his sons as they drove through the town. Their car was ambushed by men, and both his sons were killed by gunfire while he was severely injured. He died an hour later in the hospital. Shi'as in Iraq, as well as most international observers, suspect the Iraqi Baathist government of being involved in, if not directly responsible for, their murders. Anger at, among other things, the government's involvement in Sadr's death helped spark the 1999 Shia uprising in Iraq.
 
Following the fall of Baghdad, the majority-Shi'a suburb of Revolution City (Saddam City) was unofficially but popularly renamed to Sadr City in his honour. Sadr City was the first part of Baghdad to overthrow the Baath Party in 2003. 

Mohammad al-Sadr's son, Muqtada al-Sadr, is currently the leader of the Sadrist movement and bases his legitimacy upon his relationship to his father. He led a guerrilla uprising against Coalition forces and the new Iraqi government as part of the Iraqi Insurgency between 2004 and 2008.

Works 

 Al-Islam wal-Mithaq al-Alimiyah lil-Huquq al-Insan (Islam and the International Covenant on Human Rights)
Ma Wara al-Fiqh (What is behind Jurisprudence)
 Fiqh al-Asha'ir (Tribal Jurisprudence)

See also

Muhammad Baqir al-Sadr
Kamal alHaydari
Mohammad Yaqoobi
Ismail al-Sadr
Haydar al-Sadr
Sadr al-Din al-Sadr
Musa al-Sadr
List of Shi'a Muslim scholars of Islam

References

"The Sadrist Movement", with additional insight on Muqtada al-Sadr's family background, including his father's books, at the Middle East Intelligence Bulletin
Professor Juan Cole, University of Michigan, History 241: American Wars in the Middle East. Lecture: The Shi'ite Sadr Movement in American Iraq, 18 November 2008.

External links
  The Murder of Grand Ayatollah Mohammed Sadiq Al-Sadr

1943 births
1999 deaths
Iraqi ayatollahs
Iraqi dissidents
Iraqi Shia clerics
Iraqi Shia Muslims
Al-Moussawi family